The 2006 Grand Prix of Houston was the second round of the 2006 Bridgestone Presents the Champ Car World Series Powered by Ford season, held on May 13, 2006, on the streets around Reliant Park in Houston, Texas.  It was the first event in Houston since a race on a downtown circuit in 2001.  Mario Domínguez won the pole, his first and only of his career, but Sébastien Bourdais came from fifth on the grid to win his second consecutive race of the season.

Qualifying results

* The first round qualifying time for Sébastien Bourdais was disallowed after his car failed technical inspection.

Race

Caution flags

Notes

 New Track Record Mario Domínguez 58.026 (Qualifying Session #2)
 New Race Lap Record Sébastien Bourdais 1:00.176
 New Race Record Sébastien Bourdais 1:59:57.021
 Average Speed 81.154 mph

Championship standings after the race

Drivers' Championship standings

 Note: Only the top five positions are included.

References

External links
 Thursday Qualifying Results 
 Friday Qualifying Results 
 Race Results

Houston
Grand Prix of Houston
Grand Prix of Houston